The Plains Algonquian languages are commonly grouped together as a subgroup of the larger Algonquian family, itself a member of the Algic family. Though the grouping is often encountered in the literature, it is an areal grouping rather than a genetic one. In other words, the languages are grouped together because they were spoken near one another, not because they are more closely related to one another than to any other Algonquian language. Most studies indicate that within the Algonquian family, only Eastern Algonquian constitutes a separate genetic subgroup.

Family
The Plains Algonquian languages are well known for having diverged significantly from Proto-Algonquian (the parent of all Algonquian languages), both phonologically and lexically. For example, Proto-Algonquian *keriwa, "eagle", becomes Cheyenne netse; Proto-Algonquian *weθali, "her husband", becomes Arapaho ííx, *nepyi, "water" becomes Gros Ventre níc, *wa·poswa, "hare" becomes Arapaho nóóku, *maθkwa, "bear" becomes Arapaho wox, and *sakime·wa, "fly" becomes Arapaho noubee. Proto-Algonquian *eθkwe·wa 'woman' becomes Arapaho hisei, Cheyenne hé’e, Gros Ventre iiθe, and Nitsitapi skiima "female animal" and -ohkiimi- "have a wife".

Family division

The languages are listed below along with dialects and subdialects. This classification follows Goddard (1996, 2001) and Mithun (1999).

1. Blackfoot (also known as Blackfeet)
2. Arapahoan
 i. Arapaho-Atsina
 Arapaho (also known as Arapahoe or Arapafoe)
 Gros Ventre (also known as Atsina, Aáni, Ahahnelin, Ahe, A'aninin, A'ane, or A'ananin) (†)
 Besawunena (†)
 Nawathinehena (†)
  Ha’anahawunena (†)
3. Cheyenne
 Cheyenne
 Sutaio (also known as Soʼtaaʼe) (†)

See also
Algonquian peoples

References

External links
Algonquian Family
Algonquian languages

Bibliography
 Berman, Howard (2006). "Studies in Blackfoot prehistory". International Journal of American Linguistics, vol. 72, no. 2, 264–284.
 Campbell, Lyle (1997). American Indian languages: The historical linguistics of Native America. New York: Oxford University Press. .
 Goddard, Ives (1994). "The West-to-East Cline in Algonquian Dialectology." In William Cowan, ed., Papers of the 25th Algonquian Conference 187-211. Ottawa: Carleton University.
———— (1996). "Introduction". In Ives Goddard, ed., "Languages". Vol. 17 of William Sturtevant, ed., The Handbook of North American Indians. Washington, D.C.: Smithsonian Institution.
———— (2001). "The Algonquian Languages of the Plains". In Raymond J. DeMaille, ed., "Plains". Vol. 13 of William Sturtevant, ed., The Handbook of North American Indians. Washington, D.C.: Smithsonian Institution.
 Mithun, Marianne (1999). The languages of Native North America. Cambridge: Cambridge University Press.  (hbk); .

 
Algonquian languages
Indigenous languages of the North American Plains
Indigenous languages of North America